Assiniboia East was a federal electoral district in Northwest Territories and Saskatchewan, Canada, that was represented in the House of Commons of Canada from 1887 to 1908.

This riding was created in 1886 in the Northwest Territories. Following the creation of the province of Saskatchewan in 1905, Assiniboia East became a riding in Saskatchewan until it was abolished in 1907 when it was redistributed into Assiniboia,  Qu'Appelle and Saltcoats ridings.

Election results

By-election:   Mr. Perley appointed to the Senate, 3 August 1888

By-election:   On Mr. Dewdney's resignation, 26 October 1892

See also 

 List of Canadian federal electoral districts
 Past Canadian electoral districts

External links 
 
 

Former federal electoral districts of Northwest Territories
Former federal electoral districts of Saskatchewan